Chrysogaster antitheus  (Walker, 1849), the  Short-haired Wrinkle Fly, is a fairly common species of syrphid fly found in North America. Hoverflies get their names from the ability to remain nearly motionless while in flight. The adults are also known as flower flies for they are commonly found around and on flowers, from which they get both energy-giving nectar and protein-rich pollen. The larvae in this genus are aquatic rat-tailed larvae.

Distribution
Canada, United States.

References

Eristalinae
Insects described in 1849
Diptera of North America
Taxa named by Francis Walker (entomologist)